Decommunization in Russia is the process of dealing with the communist legacies in terms of institutions and personnel that tends towards breaking with the Soviet past. Compared with the decommunization efforts of the other former constituents of the Eastern Bloc and the Soviet Union, it has been restricted to half-measures, if conducted at all.

Notable anti-communist measures in the Russian Federation include the banning of the Communist Party of the Soviet Union (and the creation of the Communist Party of the Russian Federation) as well as changing the names of some Russian cities back to what they were before the 1917 October Revolution (Leningrad to Saint Petersburg, Sverdlovsk to Yekaterinburg and Gorky to Nizhny Novgorod), though others were maintained, with Ulyanovsk (former Simbirsk), Tolyatti (former Stavropol) and Kirov (former Vyatka) being examples. Even though Leningrad and Sverdlovsk were renamed, regions that were named after them are still officially called Leningrad and Sverdlovsk oblasts. 

Nostalgia for the Soviet Union is gradually on the rise in Russia. Communist symbols continue to form an important part of the rhetoric used in state-controlled media, as banning on them in other countries is seen by the Russian foreign ministry as "sacrilege" and "a perverse idea of good and evil". The process of decommunization in Ukraine, a neighbouring post-Soviet state, was met with fierce criticism by Russia, who regularly dismisses Soviet war crimes.

The State Anthem of the Russian Federation, adopted in 2000 (the same year Vladimir Putin began his first term as president of Russia), uses the exact same music as the State Anthem of the Soviet Union, but with new lyrics written by Sergey Mikhalkov.

August 1991 attempted coup
On 23 August 1991, two days after the failure of the August Coup, Russian President Boris Yeltsin suspended the existence of the Communist Party of the Russian SFSR, pending investigation of its role in the recent events. This decision was taken over the objections of Soviet President Mikhail Gorbachev, who insisted that the Party as a whole was not to blame. The Communist Party Regional committees (obkom) in the Russian SFSR were closed, and the building of the Central Committee of the CPSU on the Old Square in Moscow was sealed.

The following day, on 24 August 1991, Gorbachev dissolved the Central Committee of the Communist Party of the Soviet Union (CPSU) and resigned as its Secretary General while remaining President of the Soviet Union. On 25 August, Yeltsin issued another decree nationalizing the property of the Communist Party, including its archives and bank accounts, and transferring their control to the RSFSR Council of Ministers.

Within a few weeks after the coup, the Soviet Union peacefully broke up. On 6 November 1991, Yeltsin banned the Communist Party of the Soviet Union (CPSU), which had exercised pervasive control over Russian society for years. The breakup of the Soviet Union was acknowledged in the Belavezha Accords of 8 December, ratified by the Supreme Soviet of the Russian SFSR on 12 December. On 26 December 1991, the dissolution of the Soviet Union was declared. Its largest constituent republic, the Russian SFSR, was renamed the Russian Federation. It was formally established on 1 January 1992 and became the legal successor state of the Soviet Union.

Coup investigation, 1991–1992
The Parliamentary Commission for Investigating Causes and Reasons of the coup attempt was established in 1991 under Lev Ponomaryov (including also Gleb Yakunin), but in 1992 it was dissolved at Ruslan Khasbulatov's insistence. Having gained access to secret KGB archives as a member of the committee, in March 1992, Gleb Yakunin published materials about co-operation of the Moscow Patriarchate with KGB. He claimed that Patriarch Alexius II, Mitropolit Filaret of Kiev, Pitrim of Volokolamsk, and others were recruited by the KGB.

A large part of the archives of the Communist Party (preserved now in state archives such as Archive of the President of the Russian Federation, Russian State Archive of Contemporary History, Russian State Archive of Socio-Political History and State Archive of the Russian Federation), including almost all documents of its Central Committee, remains classified. For a 1993 view on the problem, see Khubova, Dar'ia & Vitaly Chernetsky (1993). For an example of documents surreptitiously copied in those archives by Vladimir Bukovsky in 1992, see the Bukovsky Archives: Communism on Trial, 1937–1994 compiled and put online by the late Julia Zaks in 1999.

In 1992, several People's Deputies sued Yeltsin, demanding that his 1991 decrees concerning the Communist Party be declared acts that violated the principles of the contemporary Constitution. On 30 November 1992, the Constitutional Court of the Russian Federation partially reviewed the decrees and lifted the ban against the Communist Party of the Russian SFSR.

Communist Party re-established

The Communist Party of the Russian Federation was established in February 1993. A number of smaller communist parties claimed to be successors of the CPSU as well.

Unlike many other countries of the former Soviet bloc, in Russia lustration of senior Communist Party and KGB officials was staunchly resisted and has never been implemented there. Many with such a background have remained in power; most present-day Russian politicians began their careers in the Soviet period. A draft law on lustration was first put before the Russian parliament, then the RSFSR Supreme Soviet, in December 1992 by Galina Starovoytova. Neither at that time nor later have such proposals been successfully introduced. 

Those arrested for their part in the August Coup were released from prison in 1992. The charges against them were lifted on 23 February 1994 under an amnesty issued by the State Duma, which also covered those involved in the October 1993 events. 

Vasily Starodubtsev served as Governor of the  Tula Region from 1997 to 2005; Gorbachev's former deputy Anatoly Lukyanov was elected to the State Duma in 1993–2003 as a deputy of the Communist Party of the Russian Federation; the unrepentant Stalinist Valentin Varennikov (1923–2009) was a Duma deputy first for the RF Communist Party, from 1995 to 2003 and then for Rodina. Both Lukyanov and Varennikov headed parliamentary committees.

Coming to terms with the Soviet past
Conscious attempts in Russian society to deal with the Soviet past have been uncertain. Organisations such as the Memorial Society have worked on numerous projects involving witnesses to past events (Gulag inmates,  Soviet rights activists) and younger generations, including schoolchildren. The organization was officially banned in Russia in 2022.

On 30 October 2017, Putin attempted to draw a line under the past when he unveiled the massive but controversial Wall of Grief monument in Moscow.

See also
Decommunization in Ukraine
Lustration in Poland

References and notes

Further reading
(in chronological order)
Shevtsova, Lilia (1995), "The Two Sides of the New Russia", Journal of Democracy 6 (3), 56–71.
Bukovsky, Vladimir (1998), Judgement Day, Washington, D.C.: Regnery pub. 
Debra W. Stewart, Norman A. Sprinthall, Jackie D. Kem (2002), "Moral Reasoning in the Context of Reform: A Study of Russian Officials", Public Administration Review 62 (3), 282–297.
Albats, Yevgenia (2004), "Bureaucrats and the Russian transition: The politics of accommodation, 1991–2003". PhD Dissertation, Harvard University.
Nelson, Susan H. (2006), "The Bureaucratic Politics of Democracy Promotion: The Russian Democratization Project". PhD Dissertation, University of Maryland.
Satter, David (2011), It was a long time ago, and anyway it never happened: Russia and the Communist Past, Yale University Press.

External links
 Communism: A Love Affair?: Russians Nostalgic for Soviet Social Services by The Global Post

Politics of Russia
History of Russia (1991–present)
Decommunization
Dissolution of the Soviet Union
Anti-communism in Russia